Keith McKenzie may refer to:

Keith McKenzie (American football) (born 1973), former American football linebacker and defensive end
Keith McKenzie (Australian footballer) (1922–2018), Australian rules footballer